The Eyvashan Dam, also spelled Ashavan, is a rock-fill embankment dam on the Horood River about  east of Khorramabad in Lorestan Province, Iran. It was inaugurated in February 2015.

References

Dams in Lorestan Province
Rock-filled dams
Dams completed in 2015
Khorramabad County
Buildings and structures in Lorestan Province